Professor George Gow Brownlee FRS FMedSci is a British pathologist and Fellow of Lincoln College, Oxford.

Education
Brownlee was educated at Dulwich College and Emmanuel College, Cambridge where he studied Natural Sciences and was awarded a Master of Arts degree followed by PhD in 1967 for research on nucleotides supervised by Fred Sanger.

Career and Research
Brownlee was Professor of Chemical Pathology at Sir William Dunn School of Pathology, from 1978 to 2008.

Brownlee cloned and expressed human clotting factor IX, providing a recombinant source of this protein for Haemophilia B patients who had previously relied on the hazardous blood-derived product.

With Merlin Crossley he helped discover the two sets of genetic mutations that were preventing two key proteins from attaching to the DNA of people with a rare and unusual form of Haemophilia B – Haemophilia B Leyden – where sufferers experience episodes of excessive bleeding in childhood but have few bleeding problems after puberty. This lack of protein attachment to the DNA was thereby turning off the gene that produces clotting factor IX, which prevents excessive bleeding.

With Peter Palese and co-workers he developed the first reverse genetics system for influenza virus, markedly speeding up the process of developing influenza vaccines.

Brownlee authored a biography of Fred Sanger published in 2014.

Awards and honours
Brownlee was awarded The Colworth Medal by the Biochemical Society in 1976 and elected a Fellow of the Royal Society (FRS) in 1987. His certificate of election and candidature reads:

Brownlee was also elected a Fellow of the Academy of Medical Sciences (FMedSci) in 1998 and an EMBO Member in 1979.

See also
Pseudogene (database)

References

British pathologists
Fellows of the Royal Society
Alumni of Emmanuel College, Cambridge
Academics of King's College London
Fellows of Lincoln College, Oxford
Living people
1942 births